Duke Wu or Wu Gong (武公) may refer to the following ancient Chinese rulers:

Duke Wu of Qi (r. 850–825 BC), ruler of the State of Qi
Duke Wu of Lu (r. 825–816 BC), ruler of the State of Lu
Duke Wu of Chen (r. 795–781 BC), ruler of the State of Chen
Duke Wu of Jin (r. 716–677 BC), also called Duke Wu of Quwo, ruler of the State of Jin
Duke Wu of Qin (r. 697–678 BC), ruler of the State of Qin